Reincarnation is the fifth studio album by the Japanese power metal band Galneryus. It is the last album to feature vocalist Yama-B. It was released on September 10, 2008.

Track listing

Credits
Syu: Guitar, backing vocals
Yama-B: Vocals
Yu-To: Bass
Junichi: Drums
Yuhki: Keyboards, Hammond organ

Chart performance
The album reached number 55 on the Oricon album charts and #66 at the Billboard Japan Top Albums.

References

External links
 Official Galneryus website 

2008 albums
Galneryus albums